Anastasios Papaligouras (born 14 April 1948) is a Greek lawyer and New Democracy politician and was Minister for Mercantile Marine and Island Policy.

Born in Athens, Papaligouras studied law at the University of Athens and took a Masters in Comparative European Law at Brunel University, London. He was leader of ONNED (the New Democracy youth organisation) from 1976 to 1977. From 1976 to 1978, he was a member of the New Democracy Executive Committee, and from 1976 to 1981 he was a member of the New Democracy Administrative Committee. He was elected MP for Korinthia in the general elections of 1981, 1985, 1993, 1996 and 2000.

Following New Democracy's victory in the 2004 parliamentary election, Papaligouras became Minister for Justice in the new government of Prime Minister Kostas Karamanlis on 10 March 2004. He was replaced by Sotirios Hatzigakis in the government sworn in on 19 September 2007. On September 12, 2008, Prime Minister Kostas Karamanlis decided to give him the portfolio of the Ministry for Mercantile Marine and Island Policy, because of the resignation of the former Minister.

He was married to Zaira Ralli, daughter of Prime Minister Georgios Rallis, and has a daughter. Anastasios Papaligouras is the son of the right-wing politician  who was appointed minister many times between 1949 and 1976 (Coordination and Plan, Foreign Affairs, Agriculture).

References

1948 births
Living people
Politicians from Athens
New Democracy (Greece) politicians
National and Kapodistrian University of Athens alumni
Alumni of Brunel University London
20th-century Greek lawyers
Greek MPs 1981–1985
Greek MPs 1985–1989
Greek MPs 1993–1996
Greek MPs 1996–2000
Greek MPs 2000–2004
Greek MPs 2004–2007
Greek MPs 2007–2009
Justice ministers of Greece
Lawyers from Athens